Adalbert Kaubek (7 April 1926 – 31 December 2011) was an Austrian footballer. He played in two matches for the Austria national football team from 1955 to 1956.

References

External links
 

1926 births
2011 deaths
Austrian footballers
Austria international footballers
Place of birth missing
Association footballers not categorized by position